PEFC  may refer to:

 Proton-exchange fuel cell
 Programme for the Endorsement of Forest Certification – also known as Pan-European Forest Certification